Ire Ekiti, situated in Ekiti State, southwest Nigeria, is a town supposedly founded by the Yoruba deity Ogun.

References 

Populated places in Ekiti State